Toomas Varek (born in 1948 in Rakvere) is an Estonian politician. He has been a member of IX, X and X Riigikogu. In 2003 he was Minister of the Interior of Estonia, Deputy Speaker of the Riigikogu 2005–2006 and Speaker of the Riigikogu 2006–2007.

In 1972 he graduated from Estonian Agricultural Academy.

Before 1996 he was also the managing director of Viru Õlu Brewery.

From 1996 to 1999 he was Mayor of Rakvere.

From 1997 until 2012, he was a member of Estonian Centre Party. In June 2013, he joined the Estonian Reform Party.

References

Living people
1948 births
Estonian Centre Party politicians
Estonian Reform Party politicians
Members of the Riigikogu, 1999–2003
Members of the Riigikogu, 2003–2007
Members of the Riigikogu, 2007–2011
Speakers of the Riigikogu
Mayors of places in Estonia
Recipients of the Order of the National Coat of Arms, 2nd Class
Estonian University of Life Sciences alumni
People from Rakvere
Ministers of the Interior of Estonia